William Vaios Spanos (31 Dec 1924 – 29 Dec 2017) was a Heideggerian literary critic.  Spanos was a Distinguished Professor of English and comparative literature at Binghamton University, Binghamton, New York; he was a founder and editor of the critical journal boundary 2.  His work draws heavily on the philosophical legacy of Martin Heidegger, and while it does show the influence of the deconstruction of Jacques Derrida and Paul de Man, Spanos's vocabulary and concepts remain closer to Heidegger's Destruktion ("destruction") of metaphysics than to its philosophical successors.

He completed his PhD at the University of Wisconsin–Madison in 1964.

Spanos takes a post-modern approach to the West, globalization, colonization, and general interventionist foreign policy. He talks about a problem/solution mindset that America was in during the Vietnam War, and how all foreign policy now is still stuck in this framework. Spanos' work derives from philosophers ranging from Heidegger and Nietzsche to Foucault.

Spanos was born in Newport, New Hampshire, the son of Greek immigrants.  A veteran of World War II, he was captured during the Battle of the Bulge and taken a prisoner of war to Dresden, Germany.  There he survived the Allied firebombing of the city.  It was a singular experience that he only recounted fifty years later in his autobiographical book, In the Neighborhood of Zero.

Selected works

Books 
A Casebook on Existentialism 
 Repetitions: the Postmodern Occasion in Literature and Culture, Baton Rouge: Louisiana State University Press, 1987
 The End of Education: Toward Posthumanism, Minneapolis: University of Minnesota Press, 1993
 Heidegger and Criticism: Retrieving the Cultural Politics of Destruction, Minneapolis: University of Minnesota Press, 1993
 The Errant Art of Moby-Dick: The Cold War, the Canon, and the Struggle for American Literary Studies, Durham, NC: Duke University Press, 1995
 America's Shadow: An Anatomy of Empire, University of Minnesota Press, 1999
 The Legacy of Edward W. Said, University of Illinois Press, 2009
 In the Neighborhood of Zero, University of Nebraska Press, 2010

Papers 
 Heidegger's Parmenides: Greek Modernity and the Classical Legacy, in Modern Greek Studies
 Heidegger, Nazism, and the Repressive Hypothesis: The American Appropriation of the Question, in boundary 2, vol. 17, 1990
 Althusser's 'Problematic' in the Context of the Vietnam War: Towards a Spectral Politics, in Rethinking Marxism, vol. 10, no. 3, 1998
 Rethinking the Postmodernity of the Discourse of Postmodernism, in International Postmodernism: Theory and Literary Practice ed. Hans Bertens and Douwwe Fokkema (Amsterdam: John Benjamin, 1997)

References

External links
 His homepage at Binghamton University

American literary critics
Literary critics of English
Binghamton University faculty
State University of New York faculty
University of Wisconsin–Madison alumni
American academics of English literature
American people of Greek descent
2017 deaths
1924 births